is a town located in Sōya Subprefecture, Hokkaido, Japan.

As of September 2016, the town has an estimated population of 1,776 and a density of 4.5 persons per km2.

Climate

References

External links

Official Website 

Towns in Hokkaido